Froideville is a former commune in the Jura department in Franche-Comté in eastern France. On 1 April 2016, it was merged into the new commune of Vincent-Froideville.

Population

See also
Communes of the Jura department

References

Former communes of Jura (department)